Ardagast or Radogost (Ancient Greek: Ἀρδάγαστος Ardagastos; Cyrillic: Ардагаст; fl. 584–597) was a 6th-century South Slavic chieftain under King Musokios of the Antes.

Etymology 
The name may derive from Slavic rada – "council" or "rad" – "eager" and gostiti or hostit – "to host", meaning "the one who hosts the council" or "eager to host – hospitable". It could have been a personal name, or an acquired title designating the leader or chieftain of a council, assembly, or veche. Ardagast is an old Slavic unmetathised form.

Historical records 
Menander Protector writes about Ardagast in his works, and the Strategikon of Maurice (late 6th century) makes mention of him. The Strategikon spends an entire an entire chapter to the "Slavs" (Sclavenes), who in their eyes had a different form of social and political organization to that of the Avars. Some scholars think this may have been an umbrella term for a number of groups living north of the Danube, who could neither be called "Huns" or "Avars".

Military campaigns 
Ardagast may have led the Slavs who plundered Greece in 577.

After the Avar Khagan Bayan I and the Byzantine Emperor Emperor Maurice concluded a treaty in 584, Ardagast raided Thrace, penetrating as far as the Long Wall. The Slavs suffered defeats only twice: at the Erginia river near the Long Walls (583) and in the Ansinon neighbourhood of Hadrianople at the hands of Comentiolus. The Slavs were later driven out of the Astica region.

The raid in Thrace in 585 prompted Emperor Maurice to deal with the Slavs – sending an army under commander-in-chief Priscus and infantry commander Gentzon to cross the Danube at Dorostolon (present-day Silistra) and to carry out a surprise attack on the Slavs in their own territory (as the Slavs had long been pillaging the Byzantine Empire). The Byzantine army arrived at the Slavic camp at midnight, surprising the Slavs, who fled in confusion; Ardagast fell on a tree stump and was almost captured, but luckily he was near a river and eluded the attackers.

Priscus sent his lieutenant Alexander across the Helibakion (Ialomiţa River) to find Slavs who were hiding in the woods and swamps, they failed to burn out the people hiding there, but a Gepid Christian who was associated with the Slavs deserted and revealed a secret passage. The Byzantine army then easily captured the Slavs, who according to the Gepid, were spies sent by King Musokios, who just heard about the attack on Ardagast.

References 

 History of the Later Roman Empire from Arcadius to Irene, Vol 2

South Slavic history
6th-century people
6th-century Slavs
Slavic warriors